Live in Zurich is an album by the jazz group the World Saxophone Quartet recorded in 1981 and released on the Italian Black Saint label.

The album features live performances by alto saxophonists Julius Hemphill and Oliver Lake, tenor saxophonist David Murray and baritone saxophonist Julius Hemphill, recorded in Zurich on November 6th of 1981. The album features Julius Hemphill's compositions exclusively, with the exception of the opening and closing versions of Hamiett Bluiett's 'WSQ theme', "Hattie Wall".

Reception

The AllMusic review by Scott Yanow awarded the album 4½ stars, stating, "By 1981, after four years of existence, it was obvious that the most talented writer in the World Saxophone Quartet was altoist Julius Hemphill. This Black Saint release finds Hemphill contributing six of the eight pieces, including the hard-swinging "Bordertown," the colorful "Steppin" and a vivid feature for David Murray's tenor on "My First Winter." A particularly strong release by a classic and innovative group."

The Washington Post's Mike Joyce noted that "the sweeping elegance and sumptuous colors reminiscent of Duke Ellington's work are occasionally reflected in Hemphill's compositions," and stated that the album "offers further evidence of just how important and influential this group has become. The recording displays the band's exceptional rhythmic autonomy, the feverish mind of composer Julius Hemphill and the robust yet precise ensemble work of all the players."

Track listing
 "Hattie Wall" (Bluiett) – 1:40  
 "Funny Paper" (Hemphill) – 4:45  
 "Touchic" (Hemphill) – 5:21  
 "My First Winter" (Hemphill) – 6:54  
 "Bordertown" (Hemphill) – 7:30  
 "Steppin'" (Hemphill) – 7:15  
 "Stick" (Hemphill) – 5:18  
 "Hattie Wall" (Bluiett) – 1:30

Personnel
Hamiet Bluiett — baritone saxophone
Julius Hemphill — alto saxophone
Oliver Lake — alto saxophone
David Murray — tenor saxophone

References 

World Saxophone Quartet live albums
1984 live albums
Black Saint/Soul Note live albums